Pedro Alves may refer to:

 Pedro Alves (footballer, born 1979), Portuguese football goalkeeper
 Pedro Alves (footballer, born 1983), Portuguese football winger
 Pedro Alves (footballer, born 1999), Brazilian football defender
 Pepé Alves (born 1999), Angolan football defender